Jón Þór "Jónsi" Birgisson (born 23 April 1975) is an Icelandic musician; he is the vocalist and multi-instrumentalist for the Icelandic post-rock band Sigur Rós. He is known for his use of a cello bow on guitar and his "angelic" falsetto or countertenor voice. He is blind in his right eye from birth as a result of a broken optic nerve from the brain. He is openly gay. Apart from Sigur Rós, Jónsi also performs together with his ex-partner Alex Somers as an art collaboration called Jónsi & Alex. They released their self-titled first book in November 2006, which was an embossed hardcover limited to 1,000 copies. The two also released the album Riceboy Sleeps, in July 2009. They announced their separation in 2019, after having been together for 16 years.

On 1 December 2009, Jónsi's official website, jonsi.com, was launched in anticipation of his debut solo album, Go, which was released on 5 April 2010. After the release of the album, Jónsi promptly started a tour across North America and Europe, featuring songs from the album plus a few other selections, planning to tour from March to September. A decade would pass before Jónsi would release his second studio album, Shiver, which was released on October 2, 2020. He would release his third album Obsidian a year later in conjunction with the exhibit of the same name.

In late January 2010, Jónsi announced that Sigur Rós was on "an indefinite hiatus", as the band had scrapped plans for a new album previously announced to be released in 2010, saying that "they were just rumours". The band decided to take the year off, as several members of Sigur Rós recently had children, and as Jónsi developed his solo career. In 2012, the band reformed and released the album Valtari in May 2012 and subsequently Kveikur in June 2013.

Musical career
When Jónsi was 13 years old, he learned his first song on guitar, "Wrathchild" by Iron Maiden. Iron Maiden remains one of his favorite bands to this day. In 1995, Jónsi fronted a band called Bee Spiders, under the alias 'Jonny B'. He wore sunglasses on stage throughout their concerts. Bee Spiders received the 'most interesting band' award in 1995 in a contest for unknown bands called Músíktilraunir (Music Experimentations). The band played long rock songs and was compared to The Smashing Pumpkins. Jónsi also fronted a grunge band called Stoned around 1992–1993. He also uses the alias Frakkur to release his solo material, e.g., the contribution to Kitchen Motors Family Album, which marked the first release under this name.

Since 1994, Jónsi has been the singer and guitarist for Sigur Rós. To date, they have released seven studio albums.

Aside from his many years with Sigur Rós, Jónsi has collaborated with his ex-partner Alex Somers under the moniker Jónsi & Alex, releasing their album Riceboy Sleeps in 2009. In April 2010, Jónsi released his first solo album, Go, and began a multi-nation tour to promote the album from March through September across North America and Europe.

Jónsi's song "Around Us" was used for the American promotional trailer for Studio Ghibli's film The Secret World of Arriety and was also included in FIFA 11, the soundtrack by EA Sports.

His song "Tornado" was featured in Henry Alex Rubin's 2012 film Disconnect.

Jónsi also wrote the score for the 2012 Cameron Crowe film We Bought a Zoo.
  
"Boy Lilikoi" and instrumental versions of "Tornado", "Sinking Friendships", and "Around Us" were all included in the 2011 documentary This Is What Love in Action Looks Like.

Jónsi's song "Grow Till Tall" was used by the Bluecoats Drum and Bugle Corps in their 2017 competitive program Jagged Line. It was also featured in the trailer for the third installment of the Divergent series, Allegiant.

In 2018, Jonsi contributed an original song titled "Who Are You Thinking Of?" to the soundtrack of the feature film Boy Erased. He collaborated with Troye Sivan on the song "Revelation", also included on the soundtrack.

How to Train Your Dragon franchise
Jónsi recorded "Sticks and Stones" for the score to the 2010 film How to Train Your Dragon, for which DreamWorks Animation released a music video on 17 December 2010. His song "Tornado" was featured in the arena show adaptation of this film. In 2014, Jónsi co-wrote the song "Where No One Goes" for the sequel, How to Train Your Dragon 2, with the film's music composer John Powell. He also co-wrote the melody for "For the Dancing and Dreaming". Jónsi additionally wrote a rough demo (entitled "Mama's Boy") for the film, which was eventually replaced by "Flying with Mother". He wrote and performed the song "Together from Afar" for the final installment of the franchise, How to Train Your Dragon: The Hidden World, in which he also provided the vocals for the track "The Hidden World".

Dark Morph
In 2019, it was announced that Jónsi and Swedish composer Carl Michael von Hausswolff had formed a new musical collaboration they were calling Dark Morph, and on 10 May 2019, they released their first album, also titled Dark Morph. The project "promises to explore the ramifications of ongoing environmental collapse to the oceans and its inhabitants." The album consists mainly of ambient sounds, often simulating the sounds of animals and nature, and contains very few actual melodies.

Studio albums

Riceboy Sleeps (2009)
Jónsi and his ex-partner Alex Somers completed their first album together, Riceboy Sleeps, under the name Jónsi & Alex. The instrumental album was recorded in Iceland, played solely on acoustic instruments, and mixed in Hawaii. The album features appearances by the Icelandic string quartet Amiina and the Kópavogsdætur choir.

The 68-minute album includes nine tracks and was released on 20 July 2009 on Parlophone Records.

Go (2010)

A post that appeared on Jónsi's official site on 26 May 2009 stated that the artist was working on a solo album that would feature predominantly acoustic music and string arrangements from classical composer Nico Muhly. The album was set to be produced by Peter Katis (Interpol, The National, Tokyo Police Club).

On 4 December 2009, a free MP3 of the track "Boy Lilikoi" was made available to mailing-list subscribers through the website. The MP3 announced the title of the album to be Go and gave a worldwide release date of "the week of 5 April 2010" through Parlophone and XL Recordings.

On 5 April 2010, as promised, the album was released in Iceland and the United Kingdom, with a worldwide release date of the following day. The album was sung mainly in English, marking a change from the majority of Jónsi's previous work, which was sung mainly in Icelandic and Vonlenska. The album charted at No. 20 on the UK album charts on 12 April 2010 and reached No. 23 on the Billboard 200.

The Go limited-edition box set also included Go Quiet, a 45-minute film, directed by Dean DeBlois (director of the Sigur Rós concert film Heima), that features all nine songs from the album performed acoustically at home in Reykjavík, over New Year 2010.

Jónsi went on tour with his album Go on 6 April 2010. The tour did not include any venues within Jónsi's home country of Iceland. The artist's touring band included Alex Somers on guitar, sound effects, and keyboards; Thorvaldur Thór Thorvaldsson on drums; Ólafur Björn Ólafsson on keyboards; and Úlfur Hansson on bass and monome.

Shiver (2020) 
Jónsi went a decade without releasing any solo material. On 3 April 2020, Jónsi took to Instagram to announce that he was releasing music later that month, which would be the lead single, "Exhale", to his second studio album, Shiver, with an accompanying music video directed by Jónsi and Giovanni Ribisi.

The album was made in collaboration with English music producer, singer and head of record label PC Music, A. G. Cook. Jónsi had no expectation for his and Cook's initial meeting, but the more they talked, the more he realized they might be perfect collaborators.

Jónsi released another single, "Swill", for the album on 24 June 2020, with an accompanying music video directed by Barnaby Roper.

Collaborations
Jónsi makes a guest appearance under the alias 'Frakkur' on track 13, "Skyscraper Heart", on Hi-Camp Meets Lo-Fi – Explosion Picture Score by Dip (1999)
Jónsi provides vocal material on three collaborations with The Hafler Trio:
Exactly As I Say (2004 CD; a separate limited edition of 111 copies also exists containing DVD and 5.1 surround sound)
Exactly As I Am (2005 Double CD)
Exactly As I Do (2005 Double CD)
Jónsi makes a guest appearance on Tiësto's track "Kaleidoscope" on his album of the same name, which was released on 6 October 2009.
Jónsi appears on the album In a Safe Place by The Album Leaf, on the song "Over the Pond".

In 2018, Jónsi collaborated with Troye Sivan on the song "Revelation" from the Boy Erased soundtrack.

Languages

Jónsi's first language is Icelandic. He also speaks English, according to the official Sigur Rós website: 
On the first three Sigur Rós albums (Von, Von Brigði, Ágætis Byrjun), Jónsi sang most songs in Icelandic but two of them ("Von" and "Olsen Olsen") were sung in 'Hopelandic'. Hopelandic (Vonlenska in Icelandic) is the 'invented language' in which Jónsi sings before lyrics are written to the vocals. It is not an actual language by definition (no vocabulary, grammar, etc.), but rather a form of gibberish vocals that fit to the music and act as another instrument. Jónsi likens it to what singers sometimes do when they've decided on the melody, but haven't written the lyrics yet. Hopelandic (Vonlenska) got its name (from a journalist, not Jónsi himself) from the first song which Jónsi sang on, "Hope" (Von).

Instruments
Like a few other players of the bowed guitar, Jónsi plays mainly variations of the Les Paul. He also plays Ibanez Les Paul copies, model PF200. The first Ibanez used to be his main instrument during the Bee Spiders era all through Ágætis Byrjun. It was largely refinished and decorated (as can be seen in Ágúst Jakobsson's documentary Popp í Reykjavík). That particular instrument got stolen and broken but was on display in the Reykjavík Art Museum in the summer of 2003. During the recordings of Takk..., Jónsi bought another PF200 to replace the Les Paul. Since the summer of 2006, Jónsi has been using a guitar that was made on the road by his then guitar tech Dan Johnson. The guitar is usually referred to as "The Bird", after the band's bird designs seen on previous album artwork that adorn the neck and frets of the guitar. "The Bird" is based on the body of the Ibanez PF200. The artist has also been seen playing a variety of other instruments such as the piano, acoustic guitar, electric bass guitar, harmonium, mellotron, baritone ukulele, and the banjo.

Activism
In 2003, he was escorted off the premises while protesting against Kárahnjúkar Hydropower Plant in Iceland.

Jónsi is a vegetarian. He states that he "didn't go vegetarian because of the animals" but became gradually more concerned for their welfare. Jónsi elaborated that he would find it difficult to date someone who eats meat, saying "I just love animals and I do not want to kill them, cook them or eat them so it’d be hard for me to watch anyone do that." He briefly followed a raw food diet, although he no longer practices this as he felt it hindered his social life and he was "getting antisocial" when on tour.

Visual arts
Alongside his visual art collaboration with Alex Somers, he has also exhibited his own work. He had an installation at the Los Angeles branch of Tanya Bonakdar Gallery in late 2019.

Discography

Albums

Studio albums

Collaborative albums

Jónsi & Alex (with Alex Somers)

Dark Morph (with Carl Michael von Hausswolff)

Other collaborative albums

Soundtrack albums

Live albums

Compilation albums

Film albums

Extended plays

Singles

As lead artist

As featured artist

Other appearances

References

External links
Official site

1975 births
21st-century Icelandic male singers
English-language singers from Iceland
Countertenors
Lead guitarists
Icelandic gay musicians
Icelandic LGBT rights activists
Icelandic LGBT singers
Living people
Annie Award winners
Progressive rock guitarists
Alternative rock pianists
Alternative rock guitarists
Sigur Rós members
Icelandic rock guitarists
Gay singers
Blind musicians
Male pianists
20th-century LGBT people
21st-century LGBT people
Blind people
Icelandic people with disabilities